Elson Seale is a Barbados-American soccer forward who played in the North American Soccer League, American Soccer League and Major Indoor Soccer League.  He is currently an independent businessman in the Kansas City area.

Seale attended Columbia High School in Maplewood, New Jersey, graduating in 1971. In 1999, he was named by The Star-Ledger as one of the top ten New Jersey high school soccer players of the 1970s.  He then attended Philadelphia University, where he played on the men's soccer team from 1974 to 1977.  He was a 1973 Honorable Mention (third team), 1974 Second Team and 1975 First-Team All-American.  He graduated in 1976.  He was inducted into the school's Athletic Hall of Fame in 2005.

He began his professional career in 1978 with the Portland Timbers of the North American Soccer League.  In 1979, he moved indoors with the Philadelphia Fever of the Major Indoor Soccer League.  In 1981, he returned to outdoor soccer with the Pennsylvania Stoners of the American Soccer League.  He then finished his career with the Kansas City Comets of MISL.  He may have also spent time in the German Regionalliga.

In 1989, he founded Packaging Solutions in Kansas City, Missouri.  In 1997, he founded Bajan Industries, also in Kansas City, while remaining CEO and president of Packaging Solutions.

References

External links
NASL/MISL stats

Living people
1955 births
American soccer players
American Soccer League (1933–1983) players
Barbadian emigrants to the United States
Major Indoor Soccer League (1978–1992) players
North American Soccer League (1968–1984) players
People from Maplewood, New Jersey
Pennsylvania Stoners players
Portland Timbers (1975–1982) players
Philadelphia Fever (MISL) players
Philadelphia Rams soccer players
Kansas City Comets (original MISL) players
Sportspeople from Bridgetown
All-American men's college soccer players
Association football forwards
Soccer players from New Jersey